Elections to Gloucestershire County Council took place on 4 June 2009 as part of the 2009 United Kingdom local elections, having been delayed from 7 May, to coincide with elections to the European Parliament. All of the Council's 62 seats were up for election. Most divisions returned one County Councillor under the first past the post system which is used for most local government elections in England and Wales. However, some divisions especially those that were based upon towns too small for two divisions but too large for one returned two Councillors using the block vote variant of FPTP used for some English and Welsh local elections.

All locally registered electors (British, Irish, Commonwealth and European Union citizens) who were aged 18 or over on Thursday 2 May 2013 were entitled to vote in the local elections. Those who were temporarily away from their ordinary address (for example, away working, on holiday, in student accommodation or in hospital) were also entitled to vote in the local elections, although those who had moved abroad and registered as overseas electors cannot vote in the local elections. It is possible to register to vote at more than one address (such as a university student who had a term-time address and lives at home during holidays) at the discretion of the local Electoral Register Office, but it remains an offence to vote more than once in the same local government election.

Results

|}

Results by Division

Cheltenham

Cotswolds

Forest of Dean 

Note: Alan Preest stood as the Conservative candidate in 2005. Both his and David Cooksley's change in vote shares are shown in relation to Preest's 2005 vote.

City of Gloucester

Stroud

Tewkesbury 

Note: The Liberal Democrats had previously gained Brockworth in a by-election. They here consolidated this gain.

Notes

References

External links
2009 Election Results Gloucestershire County Council

2009
2009 English local elections
2000s in Gloucestershire